The Rosary Basilica is a Catholic church in Berlin-Steglitz. Designed by Christoph Hehl, professor of medieval architecture, the Neo-Romanesque-style building was completed in 1900. After surviving World War II without any damages, the church was appointed Minor Basilica by Pope Pius XII. The ornate murals inside the church were begun by Friedrich Stummel and, after his death, completed by his former students.

Bibliography
 Victor H. Elbern. "Rosenkranz-Basilika Berlin-Steglitz". Berlin, 1988
 Annelen Hölzner-Bautsch. "100 Jahre Kirche Mater Dolorosa – Geschichte der katholischen Gemeinde in Berlin-Lankwitz – 1912 bis 2012". Berlin: Katholische Pfarrgemeinde Mater Dolorosa, 2012

External links
 "Kath. Rosenkranzbasilika", history and data about the Rosary Basilica at the official website of the city of Berlin (in German)

1890s establishments in Germany
Buildings and structures in Steglitz-Zehlendorf
Roman Catholic churches in Berlin
Berlin Rosary
Romanesque Revival church buildings in Germany
Heritage sites in Berlin